Laurent Recouderc is a professional tennis player from France. He was born 10 July 1984 in Toulouse.

Career
On the junior circuit, Recouderc had defeated Tomáš Berdych, Robin Söderling, and Jo-Wilfried Tsonga. He has spent his professional career playing primarily on the Challenger and Future circuits. He played in the 2007 French Open, where he defeated Sam Querrey in five sets before losing to Novak Djokovic in four sets. He received a wild card to compete in the 2010 French Open, where he lost to the No. 5 seed Söderling in the first round.

Future and Challenger finals

Singles: 25 (17–8)

References

External links
 
 
 

1984 births
Living people
French male tennis players
Andorran male tennis players
Sportspeople from Toulouse